Humans is the tenth full-length album by Canadian singer/songwriter Bruce Cockburn. Humans was released in 1980 by True North Records.

Reception

In a retrospective review of the Rounder reissue, Allmusic critic Thom Jurek wrote, "Long regarded as Bruce Cockburn's finest moment on record, Humans, issued in 1980, is easily the most revealing of his tomes as well... Humans is universal in its confusion and hard-won willingness to endure without seeking creature comforts or easy answers. Its musical and lyrical adventure would be a watermark for any artist; for Cockburn it became the first step to musical and poetic freedom. It sounds as harrowing, beautiful, and ethereal 20-plus years later as it did when it was first issued, and offers a uniquely universal message for seekers of personal, social, and spiritual truth. This is the one to start with. It is also the one to end with."

Writing for Trouser Press, Brad Reno called it "a truly great album", adding that it "is a thoughtful, complex album, and is the best of Cockburn's career."

Track listing

Personnel
Bruce Cockburn – vocals, dulcimer, guitar
Patricia Cullen – synthesizer
Bob Disalle – drums
Ben Bow – drums
Jon Goldsmith – keyboards
Dennis Pendrith – bass
Tony Hibbert – bass
Bernie Pitters – keyboards
Leroy Sibbles – backing vocals
Rachel Paiement – backing vocals
Murray McLauchlan – backing vocals
Pat La Barbera – reeds
Brian Leonard – percussion
Hugh Marsh – violin

Production
Gene Martynec – producer
Gary Gray – engineer
George Marino – mastering
Roberto Masotti – photography
Vladimir Meller – remastering
Bart Schoales – art direction

References

1980 albums
Bruce Cockburn albums
Albums produced by Gene Martynec
True North Records albums